Adib Khansari (born Esmaeil Khansari; 1901 – January 25, 1982) was an Iranian musician.

He started music from childhood when his first music teacher was Andalib Golpaygani in Khansar. When he was 18, he moved to Isfahan.

In 1921, he was a student of Nayeb Asadollah (The Ney player). He also traveled to Bakhtiari provinces to have some research in the style of Lori Music in Iran.

In 1924, he moved to Tehran to study under Hossein Taher Zadeh, and also Hossein Esmaeil Zadeh. During his staying in Tehran, he studied the piano from Morteza Mahjoubi. After foundation of Tehran Radio Station (1940), he was invited to be one of the top artists in this organization. The community of Barbad was established by close co-operation of Adib Khansari and Esmaeil Mehrtash, as a place for theatre and music.

References
 Short bio

1901 births
1982 deaths
Iranian classical singers
20th-century Iranian male singers
People from Khansar
Persian classical musicians
Date of birth missing
Male singers on Golha